The Denver Civic Center is a civic center area that includes two parks surrounded by government and cultural buildings and spaces. Civic Center is located in central Denver, Colorado, on the south side of Downtown Denver. Much of the area is a historic district which was listed on the National Register of Historic Places in 1974 (boundaries clarified 1988). A somewhat smaller area was designated a U.S. National Historic Landmark in 2012 as one of the nation's finest examples of the City Beautiful movement of civic design. Denver Civic Center lies partially within the north end of an official Denver neighborhood also named Civic Center. It includes the Colorado State Capitol building, in the west end of Denver's official Capitol Hill neighborhood, and it includes a few buildings in the south end of Denver's Central Business District.

The Civic Center area is known as the center of the civic life in the city, with numerous institutions of arts, government, and culture as well as festivals, parades, and protests throughout the year.

Parks

Civic Center Park is part of the City and County of Denver park system, located at the intersection of Colfax Avenue and Broadway, perhaps the best-known and most important streets in Denver. The park is bordered by Bannock Street on the west, Broadway on the east, Colfax Avenue on the north, and 14th Avenue on the south. The park is home to a fountain, several statues, and formal gardens, and includes a Greek amphitheater, a war memorial, and the Voorhies Memorial Seal Pond. It is well known for its symmetrical Neoclassical design. Lincoln Park, immediately east of Civic Center Park, is operated by the State of Colorado. It holds a replica of the Liberty Bell and several memorials.

History

Civic Center was an idea that originated with former Denver mayor Robert W. Speer. In 1904, Speer proposed a series of civic improvements based on the City Beautiful Ideas shown to him at the 1893 World Columbian Exposition in Chicago.

Speer hired Charles Mulford Robinson among others to develop plans for the area. Robinson proposed extending 16th Street to the Colorado State Capitol and to group other municipal buildings around a central park area. Such a plan was expensive however. Voter approval was necessary to acquire the funds, but the measure was defeated in a 1906 election.

Undaunted, Speer gathered business leaders who brought in new ideas for the Civic Center including the creation of an east-west axial between the Colorado State Capitol, and swinging the north and south borders of the park into the city grid system.

These plans were stalled when in 1912, Speer was replaced as mayor. The new mayor brought in Frederick Law Olmsted Jr. who was developing plans for Denver's mountain parks. His ideas included an informal grove of trees on the eastern edge of the park, and a lighted concert area.

When Speer was reelected in 1916, he went against Olmsted's designs. Speer instead hired Chicago planner and architect Edward H. Bennett, a protégé of Daniel Burnham. Bennett combined the ideas of all of the previous plans, adding the Greek amphitheater, the Colonnade, the seal pond, and the realignment of Colfax Avenue and 14th Ave., around the park. The park officially opened in 1919. The City and County Building was finished in 1932.

Institutions and development

Civic Center has long been the government, arts, history, and learning nexus of both the state of Colorado and the Denver Metropolitan Area.
Among the institutions in the Civic Center are Denver Art Museum and the Denver Central Library along the park's south side, the Colorado State Capitol and the City and County Building of Denver along the east and west axis of the park, the Wellington E. Webb Municipal Office Building on the park's north side, and the History Colorado Center and the Colorado State Judicial Building to the southeast of the park. The Denver Mint lies immediately west of the Civic Center Park across the street from the City and County Building.

The area has seen a new civic development, including the Denver Newspaper Agency (northeast of the park), the home of The Denver Post. Voters in 2004 approved a new Denver Justice Center, two blocks away from Civic Center Park. This project was completed in 2010.

Events
Civic Center is known throughout the state as the rendezvous for the largest and most important cultural and civic events. Being at the center of the state and local government institutions, Civic Center has become the place for political statement for various groups and individuals representing a variety of causes. In 1990 and 1991, the Civic Center was the location of the CART Grand Prix of Denver.

It was Civic Center where the public held a vigil for the victims of Columbine High School massacre, and 9/11. Former presidential candidate and Denver native John Kerry made a 2004 campaign stop at Civic Center, and 2008 Democratic nominee Barack Obama gave a speech there on October 26, 2008 to an estimated 100,000 supporters.

On October 11, 2019, a School strike for climate protest was held in Civic Center Park with Greta Thunberg.

Civic Center is also the location for many annual events. These include:
 January - The City and County Building has a Christmas lights display up until the National Western Stock Show ends in mid January.
 March – Civic Center is at the end of one of the longest St. Patrick's Day parades in the nation.
 April - Flyhi 420 Festival an annual pro-cannabis rally/ cannabis culture gathering is held in Civic Center every year on April 20, otherwise known as 420.
 May - Denver has a large Cinco de Mayo festival, held at Civic Center.
 June - Civic Center is host to the People's Fair, a bohemian festival with various music, art, political booths, and other happenings; PrideFest, the annual gay pride festival is held at Civic Center, which is also the endpoint of the parade.
 Summer - There are various theatre and music events held throughout the summer at the Greek amphitheater.
 Summer - Each Wednesday night, the Denver Cruiser Ride stops at the Greek amphitheater, which riders refer to as the "Circle of Death."
 September - A Taste of Colorado is a food and music festival held during Labor Day weekend at the park.
 October - The park is the end point for a Columbus Day parade that often brings protests from American Indian groups.
 December - The Parade of Lights ends at the City and County Building which has holiday lights from the beginning of the parade until the National Western Stock Show.

See also
Yule marble

References

External links
Denver Civic Center
http://www.civiccenterfriends.blogspot.com
https://flyhi420festival.com

Squares in the United States
Parks in Denver

Historic districts on the National Register of Historic Places in Colorado
History of Denver
National Register of Historic Places in Denver
National Historic Landmarks in Colorado